House House is an independent video game developer based in Melbourne, Australia. They are known for their video games Push Me Pull You (2016) and Untitled Goose Game (2019). The indie studio comprises four people: Nico Disseldorp, Jake Strasser, Stuart Gillespie-Cook, and Michael McMaster.

Their first video game, Push Me Pull You, released for PlayStation 4 on 3 May 2016 and for computer systems on 12 July 2016. In 2017, a gameplay trailer for Untitled Goose Game went viral, which led to the company signing a publishing deal with Panic Inc. The game was later released on 20 September 2019, to critical acclaim, on the platforms Nintendo Switch, Microsoft Windows and macOS, with ports for the PlayStation 4 and Xbox One which released on 17 December 2019. Untitled Goose Game was a commercial success, topping the download charts for the Nintendo Switch in Australia, the United Kingdom, and the United States.

In January 2020, House House confirmed they were giving 1% of all profits to the Pay the Rent movement, in recognition that they make their video games on "stolen Wurundjeri land."

Video games

References

Video game development companies
Video game companies of Australia
Video game companies established in 2014
Australian companies established in 2014
Companies based in Melbourne
Indie video game developers
Golden Joystick Award winners